Copa de España de Fútbol Americano 2014 (Spain's American Football Cup) was the 19th edition of the Cup.

Seven teams entered the competition. L'Hospitalet Pioners won the title for the fifth time in a row and ninth overall.

References

Copa de España de Fútbol Americano